Eritrea participated in the 2010 Summer Youth Olympics in Singapore.

Medalists

Athletics

Boys
Track and Road Events

Girls
Track and Road Events

Cycling

Cross Country

Time Trial

BMX

Road Race

Overall

 * Received -5 for finishing road race with all three racers

References

External links
Competitors List: Eritrea

Olym
Nations at the 2010 Summer Youth Olympics
Eritrea at the Youth Olympics